In American jurisprudence, the overbreadth doctrine is primarily concerned with facial challenges to laws under the First Amendment.

Description 
When federal or state laws are challenged in the United States court system for their constitutionality, they may be either challenged based on a facial challenge, challenging the whole of the law or provision and all applications of it, or may be through an as-applied challenge for a specific case or set of circumstances. Outside of First Amendment cases, most constitutional challenges are based on as-applied challenges, the facial challenge being  "the most difficult challenge to mount successfully, since the challenger must establish that no set of circumstances exists under which the Act would be valid", as stated in United States v. Salerno.

However, for laws involving the First Amendment, the Courts will consider a law invalidated as though through a facial challenge "if a substantial number of its applications are unconstitutional" as stated in United States v. Stevens. American courts have recognized several exceptions to the speech protected by the First Amendment (for example, obscenity, fighting words, and libel or defamation), and states therefore have some latitude to regulate unprotected speech. A statute doing so is overly broad (hence, overbreadth) if, in proscribing unprotected speech, it also proscribes protected speech. Because an overly broad law may deter constitutionally protected speech, the overbreadth doctrine allows a party to whom the law may constitutionally be applied to challenge the statute on the ground that it violates the First Amendment rights of others. See, e.g., Board of Trustees of State Univ. of N.Y. v. Fox, 492 U.S. 469, 483 (1989), and R. A. V. v. City of St. Paul, 505 U.S. 377 (1992). Overbreadth is closely related to vagueness; if a prohibition is expressed in a way that is too unclear for a person to reasonably know whether or not their conduct falls within the law, then to avoid the risk of legal consequences they often stay far away from anything that could possibly fit the uncertain wording of the law. The law's effects are thereby far broader than intended or than the U.S. Constitution permits, and hence the law is overbroad.

The "strong medicine" of overbreadth invalidation need not and generally should not be administered when the statute under attack is unconstitutional as applied to the challenger before the court. See U.S. v. Stevens, 130 S.Ct. 1577, 1592 (Alito, J., dissenting). The overbreadth doctrine is to "strike a balance between competing social costs". U.S. v. Williams, 553 U.S. 285, 292. Specifically, the doctrine seeks to balance the "harmful effects" of "invalidating a law that in some of its applications is perfectly constitutional" as a possibility that "the threat of enforcement of an overbroad law deters people from engaging in constitutionally protected speech".

In determining whether a statute's overbreadth is substantial, the courts consider a statute's application to real-world conduct, not fanciful hypotheticals. See, for example, id., at 301–302. Accordingly, the courts have repeatedly emphasized that an overbreadth claimant bears the burden of demonstrating, "from the text of [the law] and from actual fact" that substantial overbreadth exists. Virginia v. Hicks, 539 U.S. 113 (2003). Similarly, "there must be a realistic danger that the statute itself will significantly compromise recognized First Amendment protections of parties not before the Court for it to be facially challenged on overbreadth grounds". Members of City Council of Los Angeles v. Taxpayers for Vincent, 466 U.S. 789, 801 (1984). In Hoffman Estates v. The Flipside, Hoffman Estates, Inc., the Court held that the doctrine does not apply to commercial speech.

Lewis Sargentich first analyzed and named the doctrine in 1970, in a famous note published in the Harvard Law Review, The First Amendment Overbreadth Doctrine (83 Harv. L. Rev. 844). Citing Sargentich's note, the U.S. Supreme Court explicitly recognized the doctrine in 1973 in Broadrick v. Oklahoma, where the Court stated "the possible harm to society in permitting some unprotected speech to go unpunished is outweighed by the possibility that protected speech of others may be muted and perceived grievances left to fester because of the possible inhibitory effects of overly broad statutes".

References

External links
Discussion